Celle Enomondo is a comune (municipality) in the Province of Asti in the Italian region Piedmont, located about  southeast of Turin and about  southwest of Asti.

Celle Enomondo borders the following municipalities: Antignano, Asti, Revigliasco d'Asti, and San Damiano d'Asti.

Climate
Climate in this area has mild differences between highs and lows, and there is adequate rainfall year-round.  The Köppen Climate Classification subtype for this climate is "Cfb" (Marine West Coast Climate/Oceanic climate).

Sport
The town had a football club known as U.S. Cellese, and later A.S. Celle Vaglierano and A.C. Celle General Cab. However, the club was relocated and as of 2019 known as A.S.D. Asti.

References

External links
 

Cities and towns in Piedmont